John Samuel Malecela (born 19 April 1934 in Buigiri, Chamwino District, Dodoma) was Prime Minister of Tanzania from November 1990 to December 1994. He served as the vice-chairman of the CCM from 1995 to 2007, and a member of the CCM Central Committee to date.

Prime Minister Malecela headed the Tanzanian delegation which participated in the first Tokyo International Conference on African Development in October 1993.

Education
 Secondary Education - Minaki secondary school 1957–1958
 Bachelor of Commerce - Bombay University 1958–1959
 Post Graduate Studies - Cambridge University 1961–1962
 Ph.D. Honoris Causa (Humanities) - University of Texas 1977

John Malecela is one of the most experienced Tanzanian politicians. However his efforts to seek his party's nomination for presidential candidacy did not yield any favorable results on his part both in 1995 and 2005.

Positions held
 Tanzanian Permanent Representative to the United Nations - 1964-1968
 Tanzanian Ambassador to Ethiopia and the OAU - 1967
 Minister of Foreign Affairs - 1972-1973
 Communication and Transport - 1973-1974
 Mineral Resources and Agriculture 1975-1975
 Minister in the East African Community - 1975-1976
 Regional Commissioner of Iringa - 1980-1984
 Member of the Group of Eminent Persons of the Commonwealth on South African situation - 1985
 Tanzanian High Commissioner to the United Kingdom - 1989-90
 Prime Minister and First Vice President 1990-1994
 Vice Chairman of the ruling Party, Chama cha Mapinduzi (CCM) - 1995 to 2007
 Member of Parliament for Mtera - 1990 - 2010
 Former Chancellor of The Open University of Tanzania (OUT)

Notes

References
Embassy profile.  Accessed 2005-10-13.

1934 births
Living people
People from Dodoma
Chama Cha Mapinduzi politicians
Prime Ministers of Tanzania
Vice-presidents of Tanzania
Foreign ministers of Tanzania
Permanent Representatives of Tanzania to the United Nations
Ambassadors of Tanzania to Ethiopia
High Commissioners of Tanzania to the United Kingdom
University of Mumbai alumni